Bell Mountain is a summit in the U.S. state of Nevada.

Bell Mountain most likely was named after Charles Bell, a mineral prospector.

References

Mountains of Churchill County, Nevada